Operation Outflank was the first combat operation of the British Pacific Fleet (BPF). It was a series of raids by the Fleet Air Arm on the oil refineries and storage facilities of the Empire of Japan on the island of Sumatra:

 Operation Robson (20 December 1944)
 Operation Lentil (4 January 1945)
 Operation Meridian I (24 January 1945), II (29 January 1945)

Units participating in Outflank received the "Palembang 1945" battle honour, after the main target of the attacks: the refineries at Palembang.

References

 Operation Outflank - Codenames : Operations of WW2

Indian Ocean operations of World War II
Fleet Air Arm
Outflank
World War II aerial operations and battles of the Pacific theatre
Outflank
Outflank